Pink Lights a recognized anti-loitering technique from the UK that deters youths from loitering around public building by highlighting acne and skin blemishes with pink light. Since 2012, some towns in the UK have installed pink lighting around shops, and other areas where teenagers are seen as undesirable.

See also
 The Mosquito

References

Crime prevention
Youth rights